Nartaki may refer to:

 Nartaki (1963 film), an Indian social film
 Nartaki (1940 film), a Hindi and Bengali film